Sinchang-dong may refer to:

 Sinchang-dong, Seoul
 Sinchang-dong, Busan
 Sinchang-dong, Gwangju